Mireille Jean (born July 16, 1960) is a Canadian politician, who was elected to the National Assembly of Quebec in a by-election on April 11, 2016. She represented the electoral district of Chicoutimi as a member of the Parti Québécois caucus until her defeat in the 2018 election.

References 

1960 births
Living people
French Quebecers
Parti Québécois MNAs
Women MNAs in Quebec
Saguenay, Quebec city councillors
21st-century Canadian politicians
21st-century Canadian women politicians
Université Laval alumni